Sing 2: Original Motion Picture Soundtrack is the soundtrack to the animated film Sing 2, released on December 17, 2021 by Republic Records. The film is a sequel to the animated musical comedy film Sing. The songs were performed by the recurring cast members: Reese Witherspoon, Scarlett Johansson, Taron Egerton, Tori Kelly, Nick Kroll, who appear in the film. It also featured popular songs performed by Kiana Ledé, BTS, Sam i, Billie Eilish, Elton John, Kygo, Whitney Houston, Anitta, Mercury Rev and several others, which were incorporated in the film's soundtrack. All the songs were performed diegetically by the film's cast.

The album featured 21 tracks. U2 performed the film's original song "Your Song Saved My Life", which was released on November 3, 2021. The music video for the song was released on November 13 as a collaborative partnership between the artist, label and production studios, to support Education Through Music (ETM), a non-profit organization, based on Los Angeles that "aims to help provide music as a core subject for children in under-resourced schools across North America". An official website was also launched to market the track. "Suéltate" performed by Sam i and featuring Anitta, BIA and Jarina De Marco was released as the second single on November 15. The album further features an original song "Tippy Toes" by Adam Buxton, Fancy Feelings and DSCOSTU, which is a bonus track featured in the film. Another bonus track, "Christmas (Baby Please Come Home)" a cover of the 1963 version (by Darlene Love) rendered by the film's cast was released on November 29, as a single. The album also features a remixed version of the track "Soy Yo" by Bomba Estéreo.

The album was positively received and it debuted on number 41 at the Billboard 200 charts, and number 5 at the Billboard soundtrack albums. It further topped the British Album Charts upon release, finishing second behind Encanto. The album was also nominated for several awards, including the Billboard Music Award for Top Soundtrack which was lost to Encanto.

Background 

The film's director, Garth Jennings, acted as the executive producer on the soundtrack. The songs were picked regarding the mood of the characters and their intentions, with "I Still Haven't Found What I'm Looking For" (a song performed by U2) used as it "fits the emotional resolution of that film" and Bomba Estéreo's "Soy Yo" is played when "characters are at their lowest moment, and they have to jump out the window to escape the thugs that are pursuing them". Jennings, added that the track is a "real declaration of independence" which had the "joyful defiance that fits that point". U2's frontman and lead vocalist Bono made his film and voice acting debut through this film, voicing Clay Calloway, a middle-aged lion. On approaching Bono, Jennings said, "We reached out to him and were waiting for the call to tell us he's too busy doing other stuff or a 'No thank you,' but they said he'd call us in 45 minutes. We had a chat on the phone, and it turned out he loved the first film. He'd been struck by how much we all loved music; we didn't just drop it in. It was loved and used in a precise way." Halsey recorded the track "Could Have Been Me" at her home studio. Tori Kelly and Nick Kroll opined that the film and its songs "enriches kids' knowledge in music".

Commercial performance 
The soundtrack debuted at UK Compilation Chart on the 85th position upon December 17, 2021. It made a re-entry on January 7, 2022 at the 91st position and jumped to 46th on the following week, and maintained its upward trend until it reached the 3rd position on February 4 (a week after its release on January 28). As of February 25, 2022, the album peaked at second position behind Encanto. It also topped at the 5th position in UK Album Downloads Chart and 2nd position in UK Soundtracks, according to Official Charts Company. It was further listed in Billboard 200 and Billboard Soundtracks.

Release history 
The album was digitally and physically released on December 17, 2021. A vinyl edition of the soundtrack was published by Target Corporation and was exclusively made available for purchase on January 21, 2022. Another vinyl edition was released on January 28. A Japanese edition of the soundtrack was released on February 25, along with an alternative edition, with four tracks being excluded from the original track list.

Track listing

Charts

Weekly charts

Year-end charts

Certifications

Accolades

See also 
 Sing: Original Motion Picture Soundtrack

Notes

References 

2021 soundtrack albums
Republic Records soundtracks
Pop soundtracks
Rock soundtracks
Rhythm and blues soundtracks